Miguel A. Méndez (c. 1943 – May 25, 2017) was a professor of law at the University of California, Davis, School of Law (King Hall). Prior to joining the Davis faculty, Professor Méndez was the Adelbert H. Sweet Professor of Law at Stanford University Law School, where he was on the law faculty from 1977 to 2009. Before starting his teaching career, he served as a legislative assistant to U.S. Senator Alan Cranston (D-CA), staff attorney with the Mexican American Legal Defense and Education Fund, deputy director of California Rural Legal Assistance, and attorney with Office of the Public Defender of Monterey County.

He received an A.B. in international affairs and Latin American studies from George Washington University in 1965 and a J.D. from George Washington University Law School in 1968. Méndez died on May 25, 2017 at his home in San Carlos. He was survived by two daughters, Arabela and Gabriela.

References

1943 births
2017 deaths
American lawyers
American legal scholars
Elliott School of International Affairs alumni
George Washington University Law School alumni
Stanford Law School faculty
UC Davis School of Law faculty
Public defenders
American academics of Mexican descent